Khomi consists of three villages called Upper, Middle and Lower Khomi Village, located in Centre Chakhesang region. They belong to a Chakhesang Naga tribe of Phek District in the state of Nagaland, North Eastern part of India. The main source of income of Khomi villages are Agri and Horticultural products like rice, corn, millet, orange, pomegranate, mango, sugarcane, papaya, yam, beans, bitter gourd and honey bee.

Ethnic groups in India